A list of horror films released in 1993.

References

Sources

 
 

1993 horror films
Lists of horror films by year

1993-related lists